Pongpat Liorungrueangkit (born 4 October 1996) is a Thai professional footballer who plays as an attacking midfielder for Thai League 2 club Nakhon Pathom United.

References

External links

1996 births
Living people
Pongpat Liorungrueangkit
Pongpat Liorungrueangkit
Association football midfielders
Pongpat Liorungrueangkit
Pongpat Liorungrueangkit
Nakhon Si United F.C. players